is a Japanese animator and illustrator. He is a graduate of Tokyo Designer Gakuin College. He is a member of Japan Animation Creators Association (JAniCA).

Biography
Upon joining Studio Ghibli in 1990, Yoshida worked on Only Yesterday and Porco Rosso. In 1999, he left Studio Ghibli to become freelance. Currently, he is focusing on working on Sunrise and Bones works. He is good friends with fellow animator Akira Yasuda (Akiman) and has collaborated with him in numerous productions.

In 2005, he was awarded the individual prize in the 10th Animation Kobe awards. In 2006 at the Tokyo International Anime Fair, he was given the character design award for his work in Eureka Seven.

Works

Anime television
Neon Genesis Evangelion (1995–1996; key animation, episode 1) — uncredited.
Turn A Gundam (1999–2000; key animation, episodes 33, 37, 40, 45, 48, 50)
Overman King Gainer (2002-2003; character design, mechanical design, animation director, episodes 1, 2, 14, 22, 26; key animation, OP, ED, episodes 11, 13, 19)
Scrapped Princess (2003; key animation, episode 15)
Wolf's Rain (2003; animation director, 26; key animation, episode 24)
Planetes (2003–2004; ED animation; key animation, episodes 1, 7, 26)
Kenran Butōsai: The Mars Daybreak (2004; OP key animation)
Kurau Phantom Memory (2004; OP key animation)
Eureka Seven (2005–2006; character design; main animator; ED 4 storyboards, director, animation; animation director, OP1, OP2, OP4, ED2, episodes 1, 26, 43, 44, 45; key animation, episodes 1, 9, 11, 12, 19, 26, 28, 33, 42, 43, 45, 46, 48, 50)
Tenpō Ibun Ayakashi Ayashi (2006–2007; OP 2 key animation)
Dennō Coil (2007; key animation, ending segment, episode 26)
Gundam Reconguista in G (2014; character design, animation director, chief animator, key animation)
Chikyūgai Shōnen Shōjo (2022; character design)

OVA
Giant Robo: The Animation - The Day the Earth Stood Still (1992–1998; key animation, episode 2)
Gunsmith Cats (1995–1996; key animation, episode 2)
Master Keaton (1998; animation director, episode 30)
Top wo Nerae 2! (2004–2006; key animation, episode 6)
Nasu: A Migratory Bird with Suitcase (2007; animation director)

Web anime
Xam'd: Lost Memories (2008; key animation, OP)

Films
Only Yesterday (1991; in-between animation)
Porco Rosso (1992; key animation)
I Can Hear the Sea (1993; key animation)
Pom Poko (1994; key animation)
Whisper of the Heart (1995; key animation)
On Your Mark (1995; key animation)
Princess Mononoke (1997; key animation)
Spriggan (1998; key animation)
My Neighbors the Yamadas (1999; key animation)
Cowboy Bebop: Knockin' on Heaven's Door (2001; assistant animation director, key animation)
Psalms of Planets Eureka Seven: Pocketful of Rainbows (2009; character design)
Tengen Toppa Gurren-Lagann: Chapter Lagann (2009; key animation)

Games
Mobile Suit Gundam: Char's Counterattack (1998; OP key animation)
Arc Rise Fantasia (2009; original main character designs)
Eureka Seven Vol. 1: The New Wave (2005; original main character designs)
Eureka Seven Vol. 2: The New Vision (2006; original main character designs)

Others
edge - a collection of paintings (2004; illustrations)
Shangri-La (2004–2005; illustrations)
Kozue Takada's CD single Himitsu Kichi (2005; jacket illustrations)

Sources:

References

External links
gallo44 — official website.

 

Japanese animators
Japanese animated film directors
Anime character designers
People from Kumamoto Prefecture
Sunrise (company) people
1969 births
Studio Ghibli people
Living people